Danila Olegovich Buranov (born 11 February 1996) is a Russian football player. He plays as a defensive midfielder for Spartak Kostroma.

Club career
He made his debut in the Russian Professional Football League for Spartak-2 Moscow on 25 May 2014 in a game against Oryol.

Arsenal Tula
In February 2017, he signed a contract with Arsenal Tula. He made his Russian Premier League debut for Arsenal on 19 March 2017 in a game against FC Zenit Saint Petersburg.

In February 2019, after six month on loan with Strogino Moscow he joined Zenit-2 St. Petersburg on loan again.

Mordovia Saransk
On 3 July 2019, he signed with FC Mordovia Saransk.

Honours
 2013 UEFA European Under-17 Championship winner with Russia, scored one of the goals in the final game shootout.

Career statistics

Club

References

External links
 
 
 

1996 births
Footballers from Moscow
Living people
Russian footballers
Russia youth international footballers
Association football midfielders
Russian expatriate footballers
Expatriate footballers in Belarus
Russian Premier League players
Belarusian Premier League players
Russian First League players
Russian Second League players
FC Spartak-2 Moscow players
FC Armavir players
FC Belshina Bobruisk players
FC Arsenal Tula players
FC Strogino Moscow players
FC Zenit-2 Saint Petersburg players
FC Mordovia Saransk players
FC Tom Tomsk players
FC Spartak Kostroma players